A Case of Spring Fever is a 1940 American short industrial film produced by the Jam Handy Organization for Chevrolet. The black-and-white film is partially animated, partially live-action. It follows the story of Gilbert, a man whose wish that he never sees a spring again is granted by Coily the Spring Sprite, who makes springs vanish.

Plot
Gilbert's wife phones his golfing buddies to tell them that he won't be able to join them today, as he is stuck at home repairing the springs in his couch. Frustrated, Gilbert fumes that he never wants to see another spring "as long as I live," prompting the appearance of Coily, a "spring sprite." Coily brusquely grants Gilbert's wish, and removes all springs from his life. Initially relieved at no longer having to fix the couch, Gilbert quickly finds that he is unable to use most of the devices in his home, including his pocket watch, window blinds, rotary phone, and even his car, all of which rely on springs for their functionality. Every time Gilbert attempts to use a spring-based device, Coily taunts him with the phrase, "No springs!" Gilbert begs Coily to let him retract his wish, which Coily does, on the condition that Gilbert never wish away springs again.

Gilbert joins his friends at the golf course, talking endlessly about the benefits of springs. He astutely explains the mechanics of a spring and provides various examples of devices, processes, and physical reactions for which springs are necessary. Gilbert's friends become bored, then irritated, at his pontificating. At length, Gilbert is forced to stop one of the men from making the same anti-spring wish that he once made, and Coily briefly reappears to laugh.

Analysis
Though a documentary, A Case of Spring Fever eschews some features typical of the genre, instead dramatizing its events and introducing a supernatural character. It also has a parodic or mockumentary character; Gilbert is a comic figure who is infantilized by his wife and subsequently bores his friends. Nonetheless, Gilbert's claims about springs are presented as factual. For Donald Levin, "the film's use of the codes and conventions of the documentary work to increase our understanding about our shared social world, and at the same time critique and parody Gilbert's (and, by extension, its own) attempt to communicate that understanding".

Legacy
A Case of Spring Fever was parodied in "Bart the Lover", a season three episode of The Simpsons, in which an educational film about zinc includes a supernatural being who makes all zinc disappear. The film was also the subject of mockery in the 12th episode of the tenth season of Mystery Science Theater 3000 alongside the 1976 horror film Squirm. Chris Morgan called the short film "a worthy choice for the final short [featured on Mystery Science Theater 3000], a strange film with an even stranger premise".

It was also spoofed on RiffTrax October 23, 2014.

References

Further reading

External links

A Case of Spring Fever at the National Film Preservation Foundation
MST3K version on ShoutFactoryTV

1940 short films
1940 animated films
1940 documentary films
Sponsored films
Chevrolet
Jam Handy Organization films
Springs (mechanical)
1940 films
American black-and-white films
1940s short documentary films
American short documentary films
Articles containing video clips
Rediscovered American films
1940s rediscovered films
Short films with live action and animation
Films about fairies and sprites
1940s American films